Here One Day is a 2012 documentary film on the life and suicide of Nina Leichter, the wife of politician Franz S. Leichter. It was directed by their daughter, Kathy Leichter.

References

External links 

Documentary films about suicide
2012 documentary films
2012 films
American documentary films
Documentary films about women
Documentary films about families
2010s English-language films
2010s American films